John D. Williams may refer to:

 John David Williams or John David (born 1946), Welsh bassist and songwriter
 John Davis Williams (1902–1983), American academic administrator
 John Douglas Williams (born 1948), Australian politician

See also 
 John Williams (disambiguation)